Othello is a 2014 Indian Assamese language drama film directed by Hemanta Kumar Das and produced by Manabendra Adhikary under the banner of Artha Films. the film features Jupitora Bhuyan and Arup Baishya in lead roles.

Assamese feature film Othello has won the award for best screenplay in the Indian Cine Film Festival-14 held in Mumbai today, a press release stated. The film has story and screenplay by Ranjit Sarma. With music by Tarali Sarma, the film has been directed by Hemanta Kumar Das. The cinematography is by Nahid. Othello was selected in ‘Indian Showcase’ Jagran Film Festival, Mumbai along with 24 other Indian films.

This is the first Assamese film which has a call girl as its lead woman character, claims Ranjit Sarma.

Release

The film was screened at the Indian Panorama section in the International Film Festival of India in Goa  in November, 2014. The film will be released in theatres across Assam during the Rongali Bihu.

References

External links
 

Best Assamese Feature Film National Film Award winners
2010s Assamese-language films